Downtown Santa Ana (DTSA), also called Downtown Orange County, is the historic city center of Santa Ana, the county seat of Orange County, California. It is the institutional center for the city of Santa Ana as well as Orange County, a retail and business hub, and has in recent years developed rapidly as a regional cultural, entertainment and culinary center for Orange County.

The Downtown Santa Ana Historic Districts are listed with the National Trust for Historic Preservation and consist of numerous historic buildings across the area.

History
The County of Orange was formed in 1889 by William Spurgeon and James McFadden. Santa Ana was chosen as the county seat of government because of its larger growth as a town compared to surrounding towns such as Orange. The Old Orange County Courthouse was built in 1901 and the town grew into the county's main economic and political center. The surrounding old town buildings make up the Santa Ana Historical Downtown.

Location
City studies and merchant associations generally define Downtown as the area between Ross Street on the west, Minter Street on the east, First Street on the south and Civic Center Drive on the north. 

Neighborhood organizations define Downtown more narrowly, extending only as far east as Main Street, with the area east of Main part of the Lacy neighborhood; the Santa Ana Regional Transportation Center train and bus station is located at the east end of Lacy along Santiago Avenue.

Sub-districts
Downtown consists of several sub-districts: an institutional area including the Civic Center, the Artists Village, Calle Cuatro and the East End.

Civic Center

The Santa Ana Civic Center, also known as the Orange County Civic Center,  anchors the west side of Downtown and is home to city, county and federal buildings including:

City:
Santa Ana City Hall (Civic Center Plaza)
Santa Ana Civic Center Plaza (Ross, Civic Center, Santa Ana Blvd, Flower)
Santa Ana Public Library (Civic Center Dr. & Ross)

County:
Santa Ana Transit Terminal – Orange County Transportation Authority (OCTA) (Santa Ana Blvd & Ross)
Old Orange County Courthouse (Civic Center, Broadway, Sycamore, Santa Ana Blvd.)
Orange County Courthouse (Civic Center Plaza)
Orange County Public Law Library (Civic Center Plaza)

Federal:
Ronald Reagan Federal Building and United States Courthouse (4th & Broadway)
Fourth District Court of Appeals (Civic Center Plaza on the corner of Santa Ana Blvd & Ross)
Office of the District Attorney (Near the corner of Ross & Civic Center)
Consulate of Mexico (Near Civic Center & Broadway intersection)

Fourth Street/Calle Cuatro

Hospitality, entertainment and retail in Santa Ana's historic Downtown is centered along historic Fourth Street, better known locally by its equivalent name in Spanish, Calle Cuatro. Fourth Street stretches from the Civic Center in the west, eastward, with part of it a pedestrian-friendly outdoor mall.The West End, located between Ross Street, Broadway, and West 4th Street, across from the Ronald Reagan Building, is home to lounge cafés, restaurants, coffee shops, craft breweries, bars, jewelers and other retail, barber shops, and movie and concert theaters. Over the past years, this area has developed into an LGBT+ cultural and entertainment hub with facilities such as Theater Out, VLVT (Velvet) Lounge, and the West 4th Street corridor host to the annual Orange County Pride Festival.

The middle section of Calle Cuatro (roughly from Main east to Spurgeon) is home to retailers for travel, insurance, clothing, electronics, sports, shoes, baptismal certification, bridal and banking

The Rankin Building, 117 W. Fourth Street at Sycamore, is a historic building usually seen as reminder of the heyday of Downtown Santa Ana as a shopping center, with department stores such as Rankin's as well as Montgomery Ward, J. C. Penney, and Buffums. Eventually the area lost business to the new malls at Honer Plaza and Santa Ana Fashion Square when they opened in 1958, and later on, to South Coast Plaza.

The East End is a cultural hub, with restaurants such as The Playground (started by former Great Food Truck Race winner Chef Jason Quinn) and the refurbished Yost Theater. 
The Frida Cinema is a two-screen theater converted to an art-house theater showcasing independent film and film related programming, community-building, and education. Special events at the Frida Cinema include weekly Sunday matinees, student films, foreign films, film festivals, and cult classics such as the Rocky Horror Picture Show. 
In February 2015, the Fourth Street Market opened, an indoor food hall along the lines of e.g. Grand Central Market in Downtown Los Angeles. Tenants include Portola Coffee, Electric City Butcher, as well as host an incubator/accelerator kitchen where emerging food producers can prepare, package, and sell their goods. Partnered with Food Centricity, the kitchen also offers culinary education and acceleration and consulting services.

Even further east, the Santa Ana Regional Transportation Center is located along Santiago Avenue in the Lacy neighborhood.

Artists Village
The Artists Village is an area composed of art galleries, studios, creative offices, design workshops, and several restaurants. It is located on Second Street at Broadway, in the center of Historic Downtown Santa Ana. The village extends from First Street to Fourth Street, Bush Street to Birch, and surrounding the Second Street Mall between Broadway and Sycamore Street.

Originally proposed in the mid-1980s, the village was meant to revitalize one of Orange County's oldest cities and bring back part of a once-thriving downtown with dozens of historical buildings, most vacant for years.

In collaboration between the Santa Ana City Council, the community activist Don Cribb, and Cal State Fullerton’s Gallery Director Mike McGee, a plan for the Grand Central Art Center was conceived in 1994. A designated ten-square block would become the Artists Village. The subsequent success of the Artists Village has helped spawn a cultural and economic renewal.In the early 2000s, several live-work loft developments came to the downtown including Main Street Studio Lofts, East Village, as well as Artists Village lofts. These artist-centric developments allowed homeowners to experience downtown living while providing them an opportunity to help the flourishing art movement continue to move forward. Today, the Artists Village is the home to various restaurants, shops, artist galleries, as well as art institutions, including Cal State Fullerton Grand Central Art Center and the Orange County Center for Contemporary Art.

Historic Districts
Located across several of the aforementioned sub-districts, the Downtown Santa Ana Historic Districts are several historic districts listed as one entry in the National Register of Historic Places since 1984, covering  and characterized by a number of Art Deco buildings as well as two old movie houses (The West End and the Fox West Coast). The county's first Courthouse, now a museum, is located here at Civic Center and Broadway streets as is the Dr. Willella Howe-Waffle House and Medical Museum, now the Santa Ana Historical Preservation Society. The county's first theater, Walker's Theater, was built in 1909 on Main and Second streets adjacent to the old City Hall. Today, the Main Street Studio Lofts now stand where the county's first movie house used to be. Old Santa Ana was designated a California Historic Landmark (No.204) on June 20, 1935.

Events
The prevalence of entrepreneurship, diversity, and a young population (median age of 29.1) have contributed to several weekly, monthly, and annual events. Some of these events include:

1st Saturday Downtown Art Walk
Noche de Altares, largest free day of the dead celebration in California (1st Saturday in November)
Fiesta Patrias (September)
Savor Santa Ana
OC Pride Festival
Viva la Vida
Patchwork Craft Fair
Golden Years Vintage Market
Boca de Oro Arts & Literature Festival
Sound Downtown
The Blading Cup (Every November)

Development plans
In recent years, efforts have been made to renovate the retail section by continuing to attract new businesses, entrepreneurs, and a creative culture.

Officials with The City of Santa Ana have stated that in the coming years they will continue to expand its growth in an effort to compete with adjacent cities looking to capture an audience looking to live in a true downtown setting. Some of these goals include:
Attracting high-end boutique/hotels
Continuing to convert old office buildings (adaptive reuse) to upscale housing and creative office space
Converting parking lots and underutilized properties into ground-up residential projects 
Redeveloping the 3rd/Broadway parking structure into a mixed-use (housing or hotel) development
OC Streetcar, a streetcar line connecting the Santa Ana Regional Transportation Center (SARTC) to Downtown (approved by OCTA; is currently under construction and is planned to open 2022)
One-Broadway Plaza, a 23 story building which was proposed in 2008, and is currently still in development plans
Continuing to attract the "Creative Class" as well as more influential players within the technology industry

National historic district
The National Register of Historic Places states that the Santa Ana Historical Downtown District is 'roughly bounded' by Civic Center Drive, 1st Street, Ross, & Spurgeon, however, the historic district nomination form does provide a list of contributing properties and detailed maps of the included area. The district consists of two section with a total of 99 buildings that remain from the commercial code of Santa Ana. The buildings date from the late 1870s to the post earthquake reconstructions of 1934. The district is divided into two parts, north and south, due to a break in the historic integrity.

Historic Landmark
Historic Landmark at the site reads:
 Portola camped on bank of Santa Ana River in 1769. Jose Antonio Yorba, member of expedition, later returned to Rancho Santiago de Santa Ana. El Camino Real crossed river in this vicinity. Place was designated Santa Ana by travelers, and known by that name until present town of Santa Ana was founded. Erected by California State Park Commission. (Marker Number 204.)

See also
California Historical Landmarks in Orange County, California

References

External links

City of Santa Ana
Santa Ana Public Library
Santa Ana Historical Preservation Society
Santa Ana History Room Photograph Collection
Cinematic Treasures—Closed Movie Theaters, Santa Ana
National Register of Historic Places

Historic districts on the National Register of Historic Places in California
Buildings and structures in Santa Ana, California
History of Santa Ana, California
National Register of Historic Places in Orange County, California
Geography of Santa Ana, California
History of Orange County, California